Laila Dalseth (born 6 November 1940) is a Norwegian jazz singer. She was formerly married  to the jazz saxophonist Theodor "Totti" Bergh (1935–2012).

Career 
After an early debut in her hometown of Bergen, Dalseth was active on the Oslo jazz scene, recording with among others, Kjell Karlsen (b. 1961), Egil Kapstad and Helge Hurum's big band. Dalseth first recording was Metropol Jazz (1963), participated in Stokstad/Jensen Trad.Band (1973−1975), in a band with Per Borthen, as well as at Teatret Vårt in the play Havhesten (1976). With her own band, she recorded Listen Here! (1999), 1960's album One of a Kind (2000) and then Everything I Love (2003), all on the Gemini label. L. D. Quintet consisting of husband Totti Bergh (saxophone), Per Husby (piano), Kåre Garnes (bass) and Tom Olstad (drums).

Dalseth was awarded Buddyprisen 1976, in addition to being awarded Spellemannprisen i klassen jazz on three occasions, for Just Friends 1975, Glad There is You 1978 and Daydreams 1984. She was internationally recognized for the record Time for Love (1986) with Red Mitchell, Travelling Light (1986) with Al Cohn, The Judge and I (1991) with Milt Hinton, A Woman's Intuition (1995), her own sextet featuring guitaist Philip Catherine, We remember You (1986/2003) with Al Cohn, and Everything I Love 2004. Five of these releases were critically ranked among the Ten best jazz albums of the year by the American jazz magazine Cadence.

Honors 
1975: Spellemannprisen, in the class Jazz, for the album Just Friends
1976: Buddyprisen
1978: Spellemannprisen in the class Jazz, for the album Glad There is You
1982: «Asker kommunes kulturpris»
1984: Spellemannprisen in the class Jazz, for the album Daydreams
1986: Gammleng-prisen
1994: «Oslo bys kulturstipend»
1999: «Oslo Jazzfestivals Ella pris»

Laila Dalseth as Melodi Grand Prix contestant 

performed by Inger Jacobsen in the final, where it was no. 10

Discography
Swingin' Departure (1976), within Per Borthen Swing Department
Glad There Is You (1978)
Daydreams (1984)
Time of Love (1986)
Travelling Light (1987)
The Judge and I (1992)
A Woman's Intuition (1995)
Listen Here (1999)
Swingin (1999), within Per Borthen Swing Department and Karin Krog
One of a Kind (2001)
We Remember You (2002)
Everything I Love (2003)
Takin' Off (2007), within Per Borthen Swing Department

References

External links 
Biography on Norsk Musikkinformasjon
Review by Bjørn Stendahl in Ny Tid

1940 births
Living people
Musicians from Bergen
Norwegian women jazz singers
Melodi Grand Prix contestants
Melodi Grand Prix winners
Spellemannprisen winners
Gemini Records artists
20th-century Norwegian women singers
20th-century Norwegian singers
21st-century Norwegian women singers
21st-century Norwegian singers